Alonso Gonzalez Calderón (c.1610-1696) was a Spanish Captain, who served during the Viceroyalty of Peru as regidor, and mayordomo of Santa Fe.

He was born in Santander, possibly son of Antonio Calderón, who served as alguazil of Santa Fe City in 1625. He was married to Gerónima Cortés granddaughter of Diego Thomas de Santuchos and Catalina Correa de Santa Ana.

His son Bartolomé Calderón, was married to María Robles descendant of Antonio Thomas (conquistador), born in Portugal.

References

External links 
santafe.gob.ar

1600s births
1696 deaths
People from Santa Fe, Argentina
Spanish colonial governors and administrators